Gordon Dunne  (4 April 1959 – 20 June 2021) was a Unionist politician from Northern Ireland representing the Democratic Unionist Party (DUP). 

Dunne was a member of the Northern Ireland Assembly (MLA) from 2011 to 2021, representing North Down.

Born in Enniskillen, County Fermanagh, Dunne was first elected to North Down Borough Council in the 1981 local elections representing the Holywood area. He was re-elected in 1985 and 1989. He lost his seat in the 1993 local elections but regained it in 1997 and sat on the council since then. He resigned from the assembly effective 9 June 2021 due to health reasons, and his son Stephen was subsequently co-opted to the role.

On 20 June 2021, eleven days after his resignation, Dunne died of cancer, aged 62.

References

External links

Official website

1959 births
2021 deaths
Democratic Unionist Party MLAs
Northern Ireland MLAs 2011–2016
Northern Ireland MLAs 2016–2017
Northern Ireland MLAs 2017–2022
Members of North Down Borough Council
Deaths from cancer